Chunnilal Thakur was a member of the 13th Lok Sabha of India. He represented the Bhandara constituency of Maharashtra and was a member of the Bharatiya Janata Party.

References

India MPs 1999–2004
Marathi politicians
Bharatiya Janata Party politicians from Maharashtra
Lok Sabha members from Maharashtra
People from Bhandara